Dmitry Arkadievich Volkov (born 30 March 1966 in Moscow, USSR) is a two-time Olympic breaststroke swimmer from Russia. He swam at the 1988 and 1992 Olympics.

At the 1988 Olympics, he garnered bronze medals in the 100 Breaststroke and as part of the Soviet Union's 4x100 Medley Relay. At the 1992 Olympics, he garnered a silver medal as part of the Unified Team's 4x100 Medley Relay.

References

External links
 
 
 
 Волков Дмитрий at USSR-Swimming.ru 

1966 births
Living people
Soviet male breaststroke swimmers
Olympic bronze medalists for the Soviet Union
Olympic bronze medalists in swimming
Swimmers at the 1988 Summer Olympics
Swimmers at the 1992 Summer Olympics
World Aquatics Championships medalists in swimming
European Aquatics Championships medalists in swimming
Olympic swimmers of the Soviet Union
Olympic swimmers of the Unified Team
Olympic silver medalists for the Unified Team
Olympic silver medalists in swimming
Medalists at the 1992 Summer Olympics
Medalists at the 1988 Summer Olympics